Headhunter is a novel by Timothy Findley. It was first published by HarperCollins in 1993.

Plot summary
The novel is set in a dystopic Toronto, Ontario buffeted by a mysterious plague called sturnusemia, which is believed to be carried by starlings. Against this backdrop Lilah Kemp, a schizophrenic spiritualist "of intense but undisciplined powers", accidentally sets Kurtz free from page 92 of Joseph Conrad's Heart of Darkness and is forced to find a Marlow to defeat him.

Kurtz becomes head of the Parkin Psychiatric Institute (based on the real Clarke Institute of Psychiatry) and travels among the city's elites, including a "Club of Men" which is in fact a child pornography ring. Marlow, meanwhile, is a staff psychiatrist at the Parkin.

Although the reader is clearly meant to see the parallels between Findley's Kurtz and Marlow and Conrad's original characters, the book is deliberately ambiguous about whether Lilah Kemp has really performed this act of literary magic, or is merely crazy enough to think she has.

Reception
Ellen Datlow praised Headhunter as "suspenseful, dark, twisted, and complex."

References

1993 Canadian novels
Novels by Timothy Findley
Dystopian novels
Novels set in Toronto
Canadian magic realism novels
HarperCollins books
Works based on Heart of Darkness